A silver oxide battery (IEC code: S) is a primary cell using silver oxide as the cathode material and zinc for the anode. These cells maintain a nearly constant nominal voltage during discharge until fully depleted. They are available in small sizes as button cells, where the amount of silver used is minimal and not a prohibitively expensive contributor to the overall product cost.

Silver oxide primary batteries account for 30% of all primary battery sales in Japan (64 out of 212 million in February 2020).

Silver oxide batteries were used on Apollo program lunar missions for the lunar module and lunar rover power supplies because of their high energy-to-weight ratio.

Chemistry
A silver oxide battery uses silver(I) oxide as the positive electrode (cathode), zinc as the negative electrode (anode), plus an alkaline electrolyte, usually sodium hydroxide (NaOH) or potassium hydroxide (KOH). The silver is reduced at the cathode from Ag(I) to Ag, and the zinc is oxidized from Zn to Zn(II). 

The half-cell reaction at the positive plate:
 Ag2O + 2H+ + 2e- ->  2Ag (v) + H2O, 

The reaction in the electrolyte:
 2H2O -> 2H+ + 2OH-, 

The half-cell reaction at the negative plate:
 {Zn} + 2OH^- -> \overset{Zinc~hydroxide}{Zn(OH)2} + 2e-,   

Overall reaction:  
 Zn + H2O + Ag2O -> Zn(OH)2 + 2Ag(v), 

Overall reaction (anhydrous form):
 Zn + Ag2O ->[\ce{KOH/NaOH}] ZnO + 2Ag (v)

Mercury content

Until recently, all silver oxide batteries contained up to 0.2% mercury. The mercury was incorporated into the zinc anode to inhibit its continuous corrosion in the alkaline environment, which would otherwise occur regardless of whether or not the battery was providing power. Sony started producing the first silver oxide batteries without added mercury in 2004.

See also
 Battery nomenclature
 Battery recycling
 Comparison of battery types
 Fuel cell
 History of the battery
 List of battery sizes
 List of battery types

References

External links

 SR (Silver Oxide Battery) from Maxell

Disposable batteries